Lawrence Frederik Schott (July 26, 1907 – May 11, 1963) was an American prelate of the Roman Catholic Church who served as Auxiliary Bishop of the Diocese of Harrisburg, Pennsylvania from 1956 to 1963.

Biography
Born in Philadelphia, Pennsylvania, Schott was ordained to the priesthood on July 15, 1935.

He was appointed Harrisburg bishop on March 1, 1956, and titular bishop of 'Eluza'. Schott was consecrated on May 1, 1956. He died while still in office.

Notes

1907 births
1963 deaths
Clergy from Philadelphia
20th-century American Roman Catholic titular bishops